Safia Elhillo (born December 16, 1990) is a Sudanese-American poet known for her written and spoken poetry. Elhillo received a BA degree from the Gallatin School at New York University and an MFA in poetry from The New School. Elhillo has performed all around the world. She has won acclaim for her work and has been the recipient of several prestigious poetry awards. Elhillo has shared the stage with notable poets such as Sonia Sanchez and has taught at Split This Rock. Currently, she is a Wallace Stegner Fellow at Stanford University.

Early life
Elhillo was born on December 16, 1990, in Rockville, Maryland, to Sudanese parents.

Career 
Her poems have appeared in many publications, including Poetry, Callaloo, and the Academy of American Poets’ Poem-a-day series, among others, and in anthologies including The BreakBeat Poets: New American Poetry in the Age of Hip-Hop, Women of Resistance: Poems for a New Feminism, and New Daughters of Africa.

Elhillo has shared her work on platforms such as TEDxNewYork, Under Armour’s Unlike Any campaign, the South African State Theatre, the New Amsterdam Theatre on Broadway, and TV1's Verses & Flow.

Awards 
Elhillo has been nominated for the Pushcart Prize, receiving special mention for the 2016 Pushcart Prize. She was a co-winner of the 2015 Brunel University African Poetry Prize, won the 2016 Sillerman First Book Prize for African Poets, and has received fellowships and residencies from Cave Canem, The Conversation, and SPACE on Ryder Farm, among others. Her collection The January Children won a 2018 Arab American Book Award, receiving the George Ellenbogen Poetry Award, the first Sudanese American author to win the award. In 2018, she was also listed in Forbes Africas "30 Under 30" in the Creatives category. Elhillo received a 2018 Ruth Lilly and Dorothy Sargent Rosenberg Fellowship from the Poetry Foundation.

Works 
Full-length collections
 The January Children (University of Nebraska Press, 2017).
 Home Is Not A Country (Penguin Random House, 2021).

Chapbooks
 ars poetica (MIEL, 2016)
 a suite for ol' dirty (MIEL, 2016)
 Asmarani (Akashic Books, 2016)
 The Life and Times of Susie Knuckles (Well & Often Press, 2012)

Themes

In The January Children, Elhillo explores themes of belonging and identity, particularly in the context of migration and nationality.

References

External links
 Official website
 "Writer Safia Elhillo talks representation, inspiration, and the heterogeneity of her identity", Council on African Studies, Yale MacMillan Center, November 13, 2017.
 Poets.org Profile

Living people
21st-century American women writers
American people of Sudanese descent
New York University Gallatin School of Individualized Study alumni
The New School alumni
21st-century American poets
1990 births
Sudanese women poets
American women poets
African-American poets
21st-century African-American women writers
21st-century African-American writers
21st-century Sudanese poets